Ice Rink Piné (Italian: Stadio del ghiaccio di Piné) is a speed skating oval and training facility located in , Baselga di Piné, Italy.

The facility hosts the Italian national speed skating team, and is one of the venues of the 2026 Winter Olympics in Milan-Cortina d'Ampezzo.

History

The construction of the ice rink began in 1984 and was completed the following year. The official opening took place in January 1986 during an international ice speed skating competition.

The Piné ice rink hosted the speed skating and curling competitions of the XXVI Winter Universiade of Trentino 2013 and the Junior Speed Skating World Championships in February 2019.

Among the local skaters who grew up on the Piné oval are Roberto Sighel (first Italian winner of a world title) and Matteo Anesi (gold medal in team pursuit at the 2006 Winter Olympics in Turin).

The facility will host the XXV Winter Olympics of Milan-Cortina d'Ampezzo 2026. To this end, the oval will be subject to a radical redevelopment that will lead to the construction of a total coverage of the oval, with capacity to accommodate up to 5,000 spectators (3,000 people on the permanent stands and 2,000 people on the grandstands temponranee). The works, which will start in June 2021 and will end in October 2024, have an estimated cost of about 36,000000 USD. Located on the Piné plateau at an altitude of 1030 m above sea level, it will be the highest oval in Europe, giving Olympic athletes the opportunity to conquer new records of speed on ice.

Characteristics
The facility has an ice speed skating rink, known as Miola di Piné Oval, made of concrete with artificial refrigeration system (which can therefore be used both in winter and in summer with roller skates), consisting of two 113.58 metre long straight lines, connected by two 180° curves, and a total linear length of 400 metres. The width of the track is 12 metres.

Next to the oval, a sports hall has been built which houses a 60 x 30 metre ice rink, used for winter sports such as ice skating, ice hockey, broomball and curling.

Main events hosted
 Winter Olympics: 2026
 World Allround Speed Skating Championships for Men: 1995
 World Junior Speed Skating Championships: 1993, 2019
 European Speed Skating Championships: 2001
 Winter Universiade: 2013 (speed skating and curling)
 Italian National Speed Skating Championships: 1996, 1998, 2000, 2002, 2004, 2005 (sprint only), 2006, 2007, 2008, 2009, 2010, 2011, 2012, 2013, 2014, 2015, 2016, 2017

References

External links

Olympic speed skating venues
Speed skating venues in Italy
Venues of the 2026 Winter Olympics